Tepyanovo (Täpän) is a rural locality (a village) in Ravilovsky Selsoviet, Abzelilovsky District, Bashkortostan, Russia. The population was 316 as of 2010. There are 6 streets.

Geography 
Tepyanovo is located 25 km south of Askarovo (the district's administrative centre) by road. Makhmutovo is the nearest rural locality.

References 

Rural localities in Abzelilovsky District